Agia Kyriaki (Agía Kyriakí) is a village in the Kozani regional unit, Greece. It is part of the Velventos municipality.

Populated places in Kozani (regional unit)